Jeffrey Leon Bridges (born December 4, 1949) is an American actor. Known for his leading man roles in film and television, he has received various accolades throughout his career spanning over seven decades, including an Academy Award, two Golden Globe Awards, and a Screen Actors Guild Award. He received the Cecil B. DeMille Award in 2019, and the Critics Choice Lifetime Achievement Award in 2023.

Bridges comes from a prominent acting family and appeared on the television series Sea Hunt (1958–1960) alongside his father Lloyd and brother Beau. He received the Academy Award for Best Actor for his role as an alcoholic singer in Crazy Heart (2009). Other Oscar-nominated roles include The Last Picture Show (1971), Thunderbolt and Lightfoot (1974), Starman (1984), The Contender (2000), True Grit (2010), and Hell or High Water (2016). He also starred in The Fabulous Baker Boys (1989), The Fisher King (1991), The Big Lebowski (1998) and Bad Times at the El Royale (2018), along with the commercially successful films King Kong (1976), Tron (1982), Iron Man (2008), and Tron: Legacy (2010).

He earned a nomination for Primetime Emmy Award for Outstanding Lead Actor in a Limited or Anthology Series or Movie for his role in the HBO film A Dog Year (2009). He returned to television for a role as a former CIA operative in the FX series The Old Man (2022).

Early life 
Bridges was born on December 4, 1949, in Los Angeles, the son of actor Lloyd Bridges (1913–1998) and actress and writer Dorothy Bridges (née Simpson; 1915–2009). He is one of four children: older brother Beau Bridges (born 1941), who is also an actor; a younger sister Lucinda; and a brother named Garrett, who died of sudden infant death syndrome in 1948. His maternal grandfather was an immigrant from Liverpool, England.

Bridges and his siblings were raised in the Holmby Hills section of Los Angeles. He shared a close relationship with his brother Beau, who acted as a surrogate father when their father was working. He graduated from University High School in 1967. At age 17 he toured with his father in a stage production of Anniversary Waltz, and then moved to New York City, where he studied acting at the Herbert Berghof Studio. He also served in the United States Coast Guard Reserve as a boatswain's mate from 1967 to 1975 in San Luis Obispo, California, with a terminal rating of Boatswain's Mate Second Class.

Career

Acting 
Bridges made his first screen appearance in The Company She Keeps (1951); the film was released shortly after his first birthday. In his youth, Bridges and brother Beau made occasional appearances on their father's show Sea Hunt (1958–1961) and the CBS anthology series The Lloyd Bridges Show (1962–1963). In 1965, he played a supporting role alongside his father in an episode of The Loner. In 1969, he played Job Corps crew member Cal Baker in the Lassie TV series episode entitled "Success Story". In 1971, he played the lead role Mike in the TV movie In Search of America. His first major role came in the 1971 film The Last Picture Show, for which he garnered a nomination for the Academy Award for Best Supporting Actor. He next co-starred in the 1972 gritty boxing film Fat City, directed by John Huston. In 1973, he starred as Junior Jackson in The Last American Hero, a film based on the true story of NASCAR driver Junior Johnson. He was again nominated for Best Supporting Actor for his performance opposite Clint Eastwood in the 1974 film Thunderbolt and Lightfoot. In 1976, he starred as the protagonist Jack Prescott in the first remake of King Kong, opposite Jessica Lange. This film was a commercial success, earning $90 million worldwide, more than triple its $23 million budget, and also winning an Academy Award for Best Visual Effects.

In 1982, Bridges starred in one of his better-known roles in the science fiction film Tron, in which he played Kevin Flynn, a video game programmer. That same year, he starred in Kiss Me Goodbye, an American romantic comedy film directed by Robert Mulligan, with Sally Field. In 1984, he was nominated for the Academy Award for Best Actor for playing an alien in Starman. He also performed in the thriller Against All Odds (1984) and the crime drama Jagged Edge (1985).

His role in Fearless (1993) is thought by some critics to be one of his best performances. One critic dubbed it a masterpiece; Pauline Kael wrote that he "may be the most natural and least self-conscious screen actor that has ever lived". In 1994, he starred as Lt. Jimmy Dove in the action film Blown Away, opposite Tommy Lee Jones and Forest Whitaker. His real-life father Lloyd Bridges was also featured in the film, playing the uncle of Bridges' character. The film was not a financial success, managing to recoup $30 million of its $50 million budget at the box office, with its release a few weeks after another explosive-themed film, Speed. On July 11, 1994, Bridges received a star on the Hollywood Walk of Fame for his contributions to the motion picture industry. The star is located at 7065 Hollywood Boulevard. In 1998, he starred as what is arguably his most iconic role, The Dude, in the Coen brothers' film The Big Lebowski.

In 2000, he received his fourth Academy Award nomination, for his role in The Contender. He also starred in the 2005 Terry Gilliam film Tideland, his second with the director (the first being 1991's The Fisher King alongside Robin Williams). He shaved his trademark mane of hair to play the role of Obadiah Stane in the 2008 Marvel comic book adaptation Iron Man. In July 2008, at the San Diego Comic-Con International, he appeared in a teaser, reprising his 1982 fan favorite role of Kevin Flynn for Tron: Legacy, shot as concept footage for director Joseph Kosinski; this developed into a full 3D feature release in 2010.

Bridges is one of the youngest actors ever to be nominated for an Academy Award (1972, age 22, Best Supporting Actor, The Last Picture Show), and one of the oldest ever to win (winning the Best Actor in 2010 at age 60 for Crazy Heart). Crazy Heart also won him the Golden Globe for Best Actor in a Drama and the Screen Actors Guild Award for Outstanding Performance by a Male Actor in a Leading Role.

Bridges received his sixth Academy Award nomination for his role in True Grit, a collaboration with the Coen brothers in which he starred alongside Matt Damon, Josh Brolin, Barry Pepper, and Hailee Steinfeld. Both the film and Bridges' performance as Rooster Cogburn, were critically praised. Bridges lost to Colin Firth, whom he had beaten for the Oscar in the same category the previous year. In 2016, Bridges appeared in the film Hell or High Water, for which he received his seventh Academy Award nomination. For his contribution to films, he was presented with the Cecil B. DeMille Award in 2019.

Music 

Referring to his career as an actor and his passion for music, Bridges says, "I dug what an actor did, but it took me a while to feel it, to truly appreciate the craft and the preparation. Plus, I was still playing music a lot, and I guess I had a hard time choosing: was I an actor or a musician, or could I be both?"

Bridges studied piano at a young age, strongly encouraged by his mother. While working on the 1980 film Heaven's Gate, he often played guitar with his co-star, singer-songwriter Kris Kristofferson, between takes. His character in Crazy Heart, Bad Blake, was later based partly on Kristofferson. In 1982, he voiced the character of Prince Lír in the animated film The Last Unicorn, and in that role sang on two songs, including a duet with Mia Farrow. He released his debut album Be Here Soon on January 1, 2000. In 2005, Bridges, known as "The Dude" in the film The Big Lebowski, showed up at a Lebowski Fest in Los Angeles singing and playing the film's theme song written by Bob Dylan, "Man in Me".

On January 15, 2010, Bridges performed the song "I Don't Know" from Crazy Heart on The Tonight Show with Conan O'Brien. In the film The Contender, in which he co-starred, Bridges recorded a version of Johnny Cash's standard "Ring of Fire" with Kim Carnes that played over the pivotal opening credits. In February 2010, he was among the nearly 80 musicians to sing on the charity-single remake of We Are the World. On October 24, 2010, Bridges appeared at Neil Young's annual Bridge School Benefit concert and played a set with singer-songwriter Neko Case.

On April 19, 2011, Country Music Television announced that Bridges had signed a recording contract with Blue Note Records/EMI Music Group. He worked with producer T Bone Burnett and released his second album, Jeff Bridges, on August 16, 2011. On November 5, 2011, Bridges played Austin City Limits in support of this album.

In 2015, he sang on the album Strangers Again, performing a duet with Judy Collins of the song "Make Our Garden Grow" from Candide by Leonard Bernstein. The same year, he released an ambient/spoken-word album entitled Sleeping Tapes. All proceeds from the album go directly to Bridges' charity No Kid Hungry.

Bridges plays many guitars, including the Gretsch Chet Atkins Country Gentlemen Model G6122-19. In 2020 Bridges partnered with Breedlove Guitars to release his signature Oregon Concerto Bourbon CE with "All In This Together" scrawled across the fretboard.

Other work

Writing 
In 2013, Bridges wrote The Dude and the Zen Master with Bernie Glassman. Bridges found himself at a party with Glassman and Ram Dass and their conversation led to discussing the parallels between "The Dude" from The Big Lebowski and Zen Buddhism. The book was formed from what has been described as a "transcript of a five-day 'hang' on a Montana ranch."

Photography 
Bridges has been an amateur photographer since high school. He began taking photographs on film sets during Starman at the suggestion of co-star Karen Allen in 1984, with his favorite camera, a Widelux F8 that his wife bought him. He published many of these photographs online and in a 2003 book entitled Pictures: Photographs by Jeff Bridges. In 2013, he received an Infinity Award for his photos from the International Center of Photography in New York. A follow-up book, Jeff Bridges: Pictures Volume Two, was published in 2019.

Voice work 
Bridges narrated the documentary Lost in La Mancha (2002), about the making of a Terry Gilliam retelling of Don Quixote, tentatively titled The Man Who Killed Don Quixote, which would have starred Johnny Depp as Sancho Panza and Jean Rochefort as the quixotic hero. Bridges also narrated the documentaries National Geographic's Lewis & Clark: Great Journey West (2002, IMAX), Discovery Channel's Raising the Mammoth (2000), and ABC's Heroes of Rock and Roll (1979). He voiced the character Big Z in the animated picture Surf's Up. He also hosted VH1's Top 100 Greatest Albums of Rock and Roll series in 2001. In 2016, he narrated the documentary Dream Big: Engineering Our World.

Bridges has performed TV commercial voiceover work as well, including Hyundai's 2007 "Think About It" advertising campaign, and the Duracell advertisements in the "Trusted Everywhere" campaign.

On December 18, 2010, Bridges hosted NBC's Saturday Night Live; he had hosted the show before in 1983 with his brother, Beau. With the December 18, 2010, episode Bridges beat Sigourney Weaver's record for longest gap between hosting appearances on SNL (Weaver had a 24-year gap between her first time hosting in 1986 and her second time hosting in 2010, while Bridges had a 27-year gap between his first appearance in 1983 and his most recent one, also in 2010).

Personal life 

Bridges married Susan Geston in 1977. They had met while filming Rancho Deluxe (1975), on a ranch where Geston had been working as a waitress. They have three daughters: Isabelle Annie (born August 6, 1981); Jessica Lily "Jessie" (born June 14, 1983); and Haley Roselouise (born October 17, 1985). They also have a granddaughter, Grace (born March 31, 2011), from Isabelle.

Bridges has studied Buddhism and has described himself as "a Buddhistly bent guy". On most days, he meditates for half an hour before beginning work on a film set. He has learned Transcendental Meditation.

On October 19, 2020, Bridges announced that he had been diagnosed with lymphoma and has gone through chemotherapy.

On September 12, 2021, Bridges announced that his cancer was in remission: "My cancer is in remission — the 9×12 [inch; ] mass has shrunk down to the size of a marble."

Bridges also announced he contracted COVID-19 while in treatment and which he fought for almost five weeks.

Philanthropy 
In 1984, Bridges and other entertainment industry leaders founded the End Hunger Network aimed at encouraging, stimulating and supporting action to end childhood hunger. He supported President Obama's initiative to End Childhood Hunger by 2015. In November 2010, Bridges became spokesman for the No Kid Hungry campaign of the organization Share our Strength. Its goal is to present and undertake a state-by-state strategy to end childhood hunger in the United States by 2015. Bridges also supports environmental causes and organizations such as the Amazon Conservation Team.

Awards and nominations

Filmography

Film

Television

Discography

Studio albums

Singles

Music videos

See also 
 List of oldest and youngest Academy Award winners and nominees

References

External links 

 
 
 
 
 

1949 births
20th-century American male actors
21st-century American male actors
American country singer-songwriters
American film producers
American male child actors
American male film actors
American male singer-songwriters
American male television actors
American male voice actors
American people of English descent
American people of Irish descent
American people of Swiss-German descent
Best Actor Academy Award winners
Best Drama Actor Golden Globe (film) winners
Blue Note Records artists
Bridges family
Cecil B. DeMille Award Golden Globe winners
EMI Records artists
Film producers from California
Independent Spirit Award for Best Male Lead winners
Living people
Male actors from Los Angeles
Outstanding Performance by a Male Actor in a Leading Role Screen Actors Guild Award winners
People from Holmby Hills, Los Angeles
United States Coast Guard non-commissioned officers
United States Coast Guard reservists
University High School (Los Angeles) alumni